Salignac (Gascon: Salinhac) is a former commune in the Gironde department in southwestern France. On 1 January 2016, it was merged into the new commune Val-de-Virvée.

Population

See also
Communes of the Gironde department

References

Former communes of Gironde